

Awards and nominations for Pink Floyd
{| class="wikitable sortable plainrowheaders" 
|-
! scope="col" | Award
! scope="col" | Year
! scope="col" | Nominee(s)
! scope="col" | Category
! scope="col" | Result
! scope="col" class="unsortable"| 
|-
!scope="row" rowspan=2|American Music Awards
| 1981
| "Another Brick in the Wall"
| Favorite Pop/Rock Song
| 
| 
|-
| 1995
| Themselves
| Favorite Pop/Rock Band/Duo/Group
| 
| 
|-
!scope="row" rowspan=2|BAFTA Film Awards
| rowspan=2|1983
| "Another Brick in the Wall"
| Best Original Song
| 
| rowspan=2|
|-
| Pink Floyd – The Wall
| Best Sound
| 
|-
! scope="row" rowspan=3|Brit Awards
| rowspan=2|1977
| Themselves
| British Group
| 
| rowspan=2|
|-
| The Dark Side of the Moon
| rowspan=2|British Album of the Year
| 
|-
| 1995
| The Division Bell
| 
| 
|-
!scope="row"|Demmy Awards
| 2005
| "Breathe"
| Best Multichannel Track
| 
| 
|-
!scope="row" rowspan=4|ECHO Awards
| 1995
| Themselves
| Best International Group
| 
| 
|-
| 2007
| Pulse
| Best International Music DVD
| 
| 
|-
| rowspan=2|2015
| Themselves
| Best International Group
| 
| rowspan=2|
|-
| The Endless River
| Best International Album
| 
|-
!scope="row" rowspan=4|Grammy Awards
| rowspan=2|1981
| rowspan=2|The Wall
| Album of the Year
| 
| rowspan=4|
|-
| Best Rock Performance by a Duo or Group with Vocal
| 
|-
| 1990
| Delicate Sound of Thunder
| Best Music Video - Long Form
| 
|-
| 1995
| "Marooned"
| Best Rock Instrumental Performance
| 
|-
!scope="row" rowspan=2|Grammy Hall of Fame
| 1999
| The Dark Side of the Moon
| rowspan=2|Hall of Fame
| 
| rowspan=2|
|-
| 2008
| The Wall
| 
|-
!scope="row" rowspan=5|Hennemusic Rock News Awards
| 2014
| rowspan=5|Themselves
| Artist of the Year
| 
| 
|-
| rowspan=2|2018
| Story of the Year
| 
| rowspan=2|
|-
| rowspan=2|Artist of the Year
| 
|-
| rowspan=2|2020
| 
| rowspan=2|
|-
| Story of the Year
| 
|-
!scope="row" rowspan=3|Ivor Novello Awards
| 1980
| rowspan=2|"Another Brick in the Wall"
| The Best-Selling 'A' Side
| 
| 
|-
| 1981
| International Hit of the Year
| 
| 
|-
| 1992
| Themselves
| Outstanding Contribution to British Music
| 
| 
|-
! scope="row" rowspan=3|Juno Awards
| 1976
| Wish You Were Here
| rowspan=2|International Album of the Year
| 
| rowspan=3|
|-
| rowspan=2|1981
| The Wall
| 
|-
| "Another Brick in the Wall"
| International Single of the Year
| 
|-
!scope="row" rowspan=3|MTV Video Music Awards
| rowspan=3|1988
| rowspan=3|"Learning to Fly"
| Best Concept Video
| 
| rowspan=3|
|-
| Best Direction in a Video
| 
|-
| Best Cinematography in a Video
| 
|-
! scope="row" rowspan=8|Pollstar Concert Industry Awards
| rowspan=4|1988
| rowspan=6|A Momentary Lapse of Reason tour
| Major Tour of the Year
| 
| rowspan=4|
|-
| Concert Industry Event Of The Year
| 
|-
| Comeback Tour Of The Year
| 
|-
| Most Creative Stage Set
| 
|-
| rowspan=2|1989
| Major Tour of the Year
| 
| rowspan=2|
|-
| rowspan=2|Most Creative Stage Production
| 
|-
| rowspan=2|1995
| rowspan=2|The Division Bell Tour
| 
| rowspan=2|
|-
| Major Tour of the Year
| 
|-
!scope="row" rowspan=10|Progressive Music Awards
| rowspan=3|2012
| Why Pink Floyd...?
| Grand Design
| 
| 
|-
| Themselves
| Lifetime Achievement Award
| 
| rowspan=2|
|-
| Roger Waters
| Prog God
| 
|-
| rowspan=3|2015
| Themselves
| Artist of the Year
| 
| rowspan=3|
|-
| rowspan=2|The Endless River
| Album of the Year
| 
|-
| Grand Design
| 
|-
| rowspan=3|2017
| Pink Floyd: Their Mortal Remains
| Event of the Year
| 
| rowspan=3|
|-
| The Early Years 1965–1972
| Reissue of the Year
| 
|-
| Roger Waters
| Artist of the Year
| 
|-
| 2019
| Nick Mason
| Prog God
| 
| 
|-
!scope="row" rowspan=2|World Music Awards
| rowspan=2|2014
| rowspan=2|Themselves
| World's Best Group
| 
| 
|-
| World's Best Live Act
| 
| 
|-
! scope="row" rowspan=3|Žebřík Music Awards
| 1994
| The Division Bell Tour
| Best International Concert
| 
| 
|-
| 2005
| Themselves
| Best International Surprise
| 
| rowspan=2|
|-
| 2006
| Pulse
| Best International Music DVD
|

References

Awards
Lists of awards received by British musician
Lists of awards received by musical group